Santo Trafficante Sr. (May 28, 1886 – August 11, 1954) was a Sicilian-born mobster, and father of the powerful mobster Santo Trafficante Jr.

Santo Trafficante Sr. gained power as a mobster in Tampa, Florida and ruled the Mafia in Tampa from the 1930s until his death in 1954. Trafficante was heavily involved in the operation of illegal bolita lotteries. During his reign, Trafficante was a well-respected boss with ties to Charles "Lucky" Luciano and Thomas Lucchese.

During the 1940s, Trafficante Sr. maintained a strong alliance with Tommy Lucchese, the boss of the Lucchese crime family in New York City. Lucchese would help train his son Trafficante Jr. in the mafia traditions.

Trafficante died of stomach cancer on August 11, 1954; he was a member of L'Unione Italiana, and he was buried in L'Unione Italiana Cemetery in Ybor City. His son, Santo Trafficante Jr. subsequently took over the crime family.

References

Further reading 
Dietche, Scott M. Cigar City Mafia: A Complete History of the Tampa Underworld. Barricade Books, 2004.

External links 
Cuban Information Archives: Santo Trafficante Jr., includes U.S. Treasury Department records of Santo Trafficante Sr.
Creative Loafing: The Mob -- A Drive-By Historical Tour of Tampa's Notorious Wise Guys by Scott Deitche
 

1886 births
1954 deaths
Gangsters from the Province of Agrigento
American crime bosses
American gangsters of Sicilian descent
Deaths from cancer in Florida
Deaths from stomach cancer
People from Tampa, Florida
Trafficante crime family
Italian emigrants to the United States